William Scott Wallace (born December 31, 1946) is a retired four-star general in the United States Army. He served as Commanding General, United States Army Training and Doctrine Command (TRADOC) at Fort Monroe, Virginia from October 13, 2005, to December 8, 2008. He retired from the army on December 8, 2008.

Early life
Wallace was born on December 31, 1946, in Chicago, Illinois. He attended Louisville Eastern High School in Louisville, Kentucky, graduating in 1965.

Military career
Wallace was commissioned in 1969 after graduating from the United States Military Academy at West Point, then qualified as an armor officer before serving in the Vietnam War. His advisory experience as a member of a "two-man district advisory team that worked with Vietnamese troops in Bac Lieu Province.. I'll tell you quite frankly, wasn't nearly as professionally satisfying as being a battalion, regimental, division, or corps commander." After serving in Vietnam, Wallace became a company commander, battalion S-1 (adjutant), and battalion S-3 operations officer with the 82nd Airborne Division.

In 1977, Wallace attended the Armor Officer Advanced Course at Fort Knox, Kentucky, and the Naval Postgraduate School in Monterey, California. In 1983, he joined the 2d Armored Cavalry Regiment in Germany in 1983 and, in 1991, assumed command of the 11th Armored Cavalry Regiment in Fulda, Germany.

As a general officer, Wallace commanded the 4th Infantry Division (Mechanized) and then the Joint Warfighting Center and Director of Joint Training at the United States Joint Forces Command in Suffolk, Virginia.

Wallace assumed command of V Corps on July 18, 2001. He commanded the corps during the 2003 invasion of Iraq until June 14, 2003, when he left to become the commanding general of the United States Army Combined Arms Center at Fort Leavenworth, Kansas. His replacement in Iraq was Lieutenant General Ricardo S. Sanchez.

Wallace assumed command of the United States Army Training and Doctrine Command (TRADOC) at Fort Monroe, Virginia, on October 13, 2005. He was interviewed by Jane's Defence Weekly, published 4 October 2006. He said that "routine, traditional requirement process" needs to be more responsive to urgent needs on the battlefield" - is there something out there, looking through the "entire Rodolex, if you will, of developing capabilities," "that meets that immediate need[?]" He relinquished command of TRADOC, and retired from the United States Army, on December 8, 2008.

Awards and decorations
Among his awards and decorations are:

References

1946 births
Living people
United States Army personnel of the Vietnam War
United States Army personnel of the Iraq War
Naval Postgraduate School alumni
Military personnel from Louisville, Kentucky
Recipients of the Legion of Merit
United States Army generals
United States Military Academy alumni
Commandants of the United States Army Command and General Staff College
Recipients of the Distinguished Service Medal (US Army)
Recipients of the Defense Distinguished Service Medal
Eastern High School (Louisville, Kentucky) alumni